There are many Grade I listed buildings in the East Suffolk District, a district formed in 2019 from a merge of Suffolk Coastal and Waveney. There are 60 such buildings from Suffolk Coastal, and 51 from Waveney'''.

In the United Kingdom, the term listed building refers to a building or other structure officially designated as being of "exceptional architectural or historic special interest"; Grade I structures are those considered to be "buildings of "exceptional interest, sometimes considered to be internationally important. Just 2.5% of listed buildings are Grade I." The total number of listed buildings in England is 372,905. Listing was begun by a provision in the Town and Country Planning Act 1947. Listing a building imposes severe restrictions on what the owner might wish to change or modify in the structure or its fittings. In England, the authority for listing under the Planning (Listed Buildings and Conservation Areas) Act 1990 rests with English Heritage, a non-departmental public body sponsored by the Department for Culture, Media and Sport.

Suffolk Coastal was a local government district with its administrative headquarters at Woodbridge, while the main town in the district is Felixstowe, which is also Britain's busiest container port. Waveney was a local government district with its administrative headquarters at Lowestoft, that was also the main town in the district and the second in Suffolk.


List

|}

See also
 Grade I listed buildings in Suffolk

Notes

References

External links

East Suffolk